Jonah Ogunniyi Otunla OFR, (born 12 June 1955) is a Nigerian Financial accountant and former Accountant General of the Federation of Nigeria. He also served as board members of the Central Bank of Nigeria.

Education
Otunla was born on June 12, 1955 in Oyo State, southwestern Nigeria. He had his secondary education at Baptist High School, Saki where he obtained the West African School Certificate in 1972 before he proceeded to Obafemi Awolowo University where he received a bachelor's degree in Financial accounting.
He became a chartered accountant in 1986 but received the fellowship of Institute of Chartered Accountants of Nigeria in 1998.

Career
He began his career on August 1980 with Unilever as accountant. He left the organization in 1989, to join the Oyo State civil service as Chief Internal Auditor, the same year he became the Director of Finance. On June 1989, he was appointed Accountant General the State, a position he held until March 2004 when he got a transfer to the Office of the Accountant General of the Federation.
On June 28, 2011 he was appointed the Accountant General of the Federation by Goodluck Ebele Jonathan, the former President of Nigeria.
On June 12, 2015, Otunla retired honourably from the Civil Service after attaining the mandatory age of 60 years.

References

People from Oyo State
1955 births
Living people